Frans Langeveld (16 February 1877 – 27 June 1939) was a Dutch painter. His work was part of the painting event in the art competition at the 1936 Summer Olympics.

References

1877 births
1939 deaths
20th-century Dutch painters
Dutch male painters
Olympic competitors in art competitions
Painters from Amsterdam
20th-century Dutch male artists